Mary de Bohun (c. 1369/70 – 4 June 1394) was the first wife of Henry Bolingbroke, Earl of Northampton and Hereford and the mother of King Henry V. Mary was never queen, as she died before her husband came to the throne as Henry IV.

Early life
Mary was a daughter of Humphrey de Bohun, 7th Earl of Hereford (1341–1373) by his wife Joan Fitzalan (1347/8–1419), a daughter of Richard FitzAlan, 10th Earl of Arundel, and Eleanor of Lancaster.

Mary and her elder sister, Eleanor de Bohun, were the heiresses of their father's substantial possessions. Eleanor became the wife of Thomas of Woodstock, 1st Duke of Gloucester, the youngest child of Edward III. In an effort to keep the inheritance for himself and his wife, Thomas of Woodstock pressured the child Mary into becoming a nun. In a plot with John of Gaunt, Mary's aunt took her from Thomas' castle at Pleshey back to Arundel whereupon she was married to Henry Bolingbroke, the future Henry IV.

Marriage and children
Mary married Henry—then known as Bolingbroke—on 27 July 1380, at Arundel Castle. It was at Monmouth Castle, one of her husband's possessions, that Mary gave birth to her first child, the future Henry V, on 16 September 1386. Her second child, Thomas, was born probably at London shortly before 25 November 1387.

Her children were:
Henry V, King of England (1386–1422)
Thomas of Lancaster, Duke of Clarence (1387–1421)
John of Lancaster, Duke of Bedford (1389–1435)
Humphrey of Lancaster, Duke of Gloucester (1390–1447)
Blanche of England (1392–1409) married in 1402 Louis III, Elector Palatine
Philippa of England (1394–1430) married in 1406 Eric of Pomerania, King of Denmark, Norway and Sweden.

Death 
Mary de Bohun died at Peterborough Castle, giving birth to her last child, a daughter, Philippa of England. She was buried in the collegiate Church of the Annunciation of Our Lady of the Newarke, Leicester, on 6 July 1394.

Ancestry

Notes

References

Sources

External links
Middleages.org article on Mary de Bohun
Document on Women and Spirituality from the University of the West of England – contains information on Mary de Bohun's spiritual life

1360s births
1394 deaths
14th-century English people
14th-century English women
Mary
Date of birth unknown
Daughters of British earls
Deaths in childbirth
Henry IV of England
Mary de Bohun
Ladies of the Garter
Wives of knights